Eslamabad (also Romanized as Eslāmābād; also known as Eslāmābād-e Ḩājjī Mūsá and Tāzeh Deh-e Eslāmābād) is a village in Saral Rural District, Saral District, Divandarreh County, Kurdistan Province, Iran. At the 2006 census, its population was 82, in 21 families. The village is populated by Kurds.

References 

Towns and villages in Divandarreh County
Kurdish settlements in Kurdistan Province